Neoregelia melanodonta is a species of flowering plant in the genus Neoregelia. This species is endemic to Brazil.

Cultivars
 Neoregelia 'Bananas Foster'
 Neoregelia 'Beef Wellington'
 Neoregelia 'Bella'
 Neoregelia 'Blue Navy Blues'
 Neoregelia 'Bubblin' Over'
 Neoregelia 'Cathedral'
 Neoregelia 'Everglades'
 Neoregelia 'Helga's Joy'
 Neoregelia 'Kawika'
 Neoregelia 'Lost Horizon'
 Neoregelia 'Mitch Gos'
 Neoregelia 'Pandora'
 Neoregelia 'Prinz's Pride'
 Neoregelia 'Purple Heart'
 Neoregelia 'Ronald'
 Neoregelia 'Rosy'
 Neoregelia 'Rousseau'
 Neoregelia 'Seminole Warpaint'
 Neoregelia 'Shangri-La'
 Neoregelia 'Zodonta'

References

BSI Cultivar Registry Retrieved 11 October 2009

melanodonta
Flora of Brazil